Bromopentafluorobenzene is an organofluorine compound with the formula C6F5Br.  It is a colorless liquid that is used to prepare pentafluophenyl compounds.  These syntheses typically proceed via the intermediacy of C6F5Li or the Grignard reagent.  Illustrative is preparation of tris(pentafluorophenyl)borane:
3 C6F5MgBr  +  BCl3   →  (C6F5)3B  +  3 MgBrCl

Other derivatives include LiB(C6F5)4, [CuC6F5]4, and Ni(C6F5)2(dioxane)2.

References

Pentafluorophenyl compounds
Perfluorinated compounds